Altamira may refer to:

People
Altamira (surname)

Places
Cave of Altamira, a cave in Cantabria, Spain famous for its paintings and carving
Altamira, Pará, a city in the Brazilian state of Pará
Altamira, Huila, a town and municipality in Colombia
Altamira, Puerto Plata, a town in the Dominican Republic
Altamira Municipality, Tamaulipas, Mexico, a port city and a municipality
Altamira (Caracas) a neighborhood in Caracas, Venezuela
Altamira do Maranhão, a city in the Brazilian state of Maranhão
A neighbourhood in the district of Basurto-Zorroza in Bilbao, Spain
7742 Altamira, an asteroid

In business
Altamira Financial Services, a Canadian mutual fund company now part of National Bank of Canada
AltaMira Press, an imprint of Rowman & Littlefield Publishing Group
Altamira Software, a computer software developer acquired by Microsoft in 1994

Others
Altamira (film), a 2016 film by Hugh Hudson 
Altamira (album), a 2016 soundtrack album of the film by Mark Knopfler and Evelyn Glennie
Altamira oriole, Icterus gularis, a New World oriole
Altamira yellowthroat, Geothlypis flavovelata, a New World warbler
Viscounty of Altamira, Spanish nobility
Marquisate of Altamira, Spanish nobility
"Alta Mira", a song by Edgar Winter on their LP They Only Come Out at Night, 1972

See also
Altamirano (disambiguation)
Altamiranoa
Altamura (disambiguation)